Ornipholidotos issia, the Côte d'Ivoire glasswing, is a butterfly in the family Lycaenidae. It is found in Guinea, Sierra Leone, Ivory Coast and Ghana. The habitat consists of forests.

References

Butterflies described in 1969
Ornipholidotos